The 1988–89 NBA season was the Warriors' 43rd season in the NBA and 26th in the San Francisco Bay Area. General Manager Don Nelson became the Warriors' new head coach this season. In the 1988 NBA draft, the Warriors selected Mitch Richmond out of Kansas State with the fifth overall pick. During the off-season, the team acquired 7' 7" center Manute Bol from the Washington Bullets. The Warriors went on an 8-game winning streak in January, and held a 25–20 record at the All-Star break. Despite losing their final six games, the team showed a lot of improvement over the previous season, finishing fourth in the Pacific Division with a 43–39 record.

Chris Mullin averaged 26.5 points, 5.9 rebounds, 5.1 assists and 2.1 steals per game, and was named to the All-NBA Second Team, and selected for the 1989 NBA All-Star Game, while Richmond averaged 22.0 points, 5.9 rebounds and 4.2 assists per game, and was named Rookie of the Year, and selected to the NBA All-Rookie First Team. In addition, Terry Teagle provided the team with 15.2 points per game, while second-year guard Winston Garland contributed 14.5 points, 6.4 assists and 2.2 steals per game, sixth man Rod Higgins provided with 10.6 points and 4.6 rebounds per game off the bench, and Otis Smith contributed 10.0 points per game also off the bench. On the defensive side, Larry Smith led the team with 8.2 rebounds per game, and Bol led them with 4.3 blocks per game. Mullin also finished in third place in Most Improved Player voting, while Bol finished in fourth place in Defensive Player of the Year voting, and Nelson finished in second place in Coach of the Year voting.

In the playoffs, the Warriors swept the 2nd-seeded Utah Jazz in three straight games in the Western Conference First Round, before losing to the Phoenix Suns in five games in the Western Conference Semi-finals. Following the season, Otis Smith left in the 1989 NBA Expansion Draft, while Larry Smith signed as a free agent with the Houston Rockets, and Ralph Sampson was traded to the Sacramento Kings.

For the season, the Warriors slightly changed their primary logo, which remained in use until 1997.

Draft picks

Roster

Regular season

Season standings

z - clinched division title
y - clinched division title
x - clinched playoff spot

Record vs. opponents

Game log

Playoffs

|- align="center" bgcolor="#ccffcc"
| 1
| April 27
| @ Utah
| W 123–119
| Chris Mullin (41)
| Larry Smith (11)
| Winston Garland (8)
| Salt Palace12,444
| 1–0
|- align="center" bgcolor="#ccffcc"
| 2
| April 29
| @ Utah
| W 99–91
| Chris Mullin (22)
| three players tied (7)
| Chris Mullin (7)
| Salt Palace12,444
| 2–0
|- align="center" bgcolor="#ccffcc"
| 3
| May 2
| Utah
| W 120–106
| Chris Mullin (35)
| Rod Higgins (14)
| Mitch Richmond (11)
| Oakland–Alameda County Coliseum Arena15,025
| 3–0
|-

|- align="center" bgcolor="#ffcccc"
| 1
| May 6
| @ Phoenix
| L 103–130
| Mullin, Teagle (18)
| Larry Smith (8)
| Winston Garland (6)
| Arizona Veterans Memorial Coliseum14,471
| 0–1
|- align="center" bgcolor="#ccffcc"
| 2
| May 9
| @ Phoenix
| W 127–122
| Chris Mullin (37)
| Mitch Richmond (13)
| Chris Mullin (5)
| Arizona Veterans Memorial Coliseum14,471
| 1–1
|- align="center" bgcolor="#ffcccc"
| 3
| May 11
| Phoenix
| L 104–113
| Chris Mullin (32)
| Higgins, Bol (9)
| Chris Mullin (6)
| Oakland–Alameda County Coliseum Arena15,025
| 1–2
|- align="center" bgcolor="#ffcccc"
| 4
| May 13
| Phoenix
| L 99–135
| Chris Mullin (28)
| Chris Mullin (7)
| Winston Garland (4)
| Oakland–Alameda County Coliseum Arena15,025
| 1–3
|- align="center" bgcolor="#ffcccc"
| 5
| May 16
| @ Phoenix
| L 104–116
| Mitch Richmond (23)
| Larry Smith (9)
| Chris Mullin (6)
| Arizona Veterans Memorial Coliseum14,471
| 1–4
|-

Player statistics

Season

Playoffs

Awards and records
 Chris Mullin, NBA All-Star Game
 Mitch Richmond, NBA Rookie of the Year Award
 Chris Mullin, All-NBA Second Team
 Mitch Richmond, NBA All-Rookie Team 1st Team

Transactions

References

See also
 1988-89 NBA season

Golden State Warriors seasons
Golden
Golden
Golden State